Esko Antti Niskanen (14 September 1928 – 28 August 2013) was a Finnish politician, born in Nivala. He served as Deputy Minister of Finance from 4 September 1972 to 13 June 1975. Niskanen was a Member of the Parliament of Finland from 1966 to 1975, representing the Social Democratic Party of Finland (SDP).

References

1928 births
2013 deaths
People from Nivala
Social Democratic Party of Finland politicians
Government ministers of Finland
Members of the Parliament of Finland (1966–70)
Members of the Parliament of Finland (1970–72)
Members of the Parliament of Finland (1972–75)
Place of death missing